Calisto MT is an old style, serif typeface designed for the Monotype Corporation foundry in 1986 by Ron Carpenter, a British typographer.

Calisto MT is intended to function as both a typeface for body text and display text. Its stroke contrast is minimal and it preserves an even color, especially in smaller point sizes, which contributes to its great legibility. Its Roman and italic glyphs are animated by serifs and terminals that are cut on an angle to the baseline, and are concavely indented on the terminals, reminiscent of the Belwe and Palatino typefaces. Minuscule glyphs are of a somewhat large corpus size.

References

Fiedl, Frederich, Nicholas Ott and Bernard Stein. Typography: An Encyclopedic Survey of Type Design and Techniques Through History. Black Dog & Leventhal: 1998. .
Macmillan, Neil. An A–Z of Type Designers. Yale University Press: 2006. .

External links
Monotype web page on Calisto

Monotype typefaces
Old style serif typefaces
Typefaces and fonts introduced in 1987
pt:Calisto MT